Pope Sylvester II ( – 12 May 1003), originally known as Gerbert of Aurillac, was a French-born scholar and teacher who served as the bishop of Rome and ruled the Papal States from 999 to his death. He endorsed and promoted study of Moorish and Greco-Roman arithmetic, mathematics and astronomy, reintroducing to Europe the abacus and armillary sphere, which had been lost to Latin Europe since the end of the Greco-Roman era. He is said to be the first in Europe to introduce the decimal numeral system using the Hindu-Arabic numeral system. He is credited with the invention of the first mechanical clock in 996.

Early life
Gerbert was born about 946 in the town of Belliac, near the present-day commune of Saint-Simon, Cantal, France. Around 963, he entered the Monastery of St. Gerald of Aurillac. In 967, Count Borrell II of Barcelona (947–992) visited the monastery, and the abbot asked the count to take Gerbert with him so that the lad could study mathematics in Catalonia and acquire there some knowledge of Arabic learning.

Scholarly work
Gerbert studied under the direction of Bishop Atto of Vich, some 60 km north of Barcelona, and probably also at the nearby Monastery of Santa Maria de Ripoll. Like all Catalan monasteries, it contained manuscripts from Moslem Spain and especially from Cordoba, one of the intellectual centres of Europe at that time: the library of al-Hakam II, for example, had thousands of books (from science to Greek philosophy). This is where Gerbert was introduced to mathematics and astronomy. Borrell II was facing major defeat from the Andalusian powers so he sent a delegation to Córdoba to request a truce. Bishop Atto was part of the delegation that met with al-Ḥakam II, who received him with honour. Gerbert was fascinated by the stories of the Mozarab Christian bishops and judges who dressed and talked like the Moors, well-versed in mathematics and natural sciences like the great teachers of the Islamic madrasahs. This sparked Gerbert's veneration for the Moors and his passion for mathematics and astronomy.

Abacus and numerals

Gerbert learned of Hindu–Arabic digits and applied this knowledge to the abacus, but probably without the numeral zero. According to the 12th-century historian William of Malmesbury, Gerbert got the idea of the computing device of the abacus from a Moorish scholar from University of Al-Qarawiyyin. The abacus that Gerbert reintroduced into Europe had its length divided into 27 parts with 9 number symbols (this would exclude zero, which was represented by an empty column) and 1,000 characters in all, crafted out of animal horn by a shieldmaker of Rheims. According to his pupil Richer, Gerbert could perform speedy calculations with his abacus that were extremely difficult for people in his day to think through using only Roman numerals. Due to Gerbert's reintroduction, the abacus became widely used in Europe once again during the 11th century.

Armillary sphere and sighting tube
Although lost to Europe since the terminus of the Greco-Roman era, Gerbert reintroduced the astronomical armillary sphere to Latin Europe via the Islamic civilization of Al-Andalus, which was at that time at the "cutting edge" of civilization. The details of Gerbert's armillary sphere are revealed in letters from Gerbert to his former student and monk Remi of Trèves and to his colleague Constantine, the abbot of Micy, as well as the accounts of his former student and French nobleman Richer, who served as a monk in Rheims. Richer stated that Gerbert discovered that stars coursed in an oblique direction across the night sky. Richer described Gerbert's use of the armillary sphere as a visual aid for teaching mathematics and astronomy in the classroom.

Historian Oscar G. Darlington asserts that Gerbert's division by 60 degrees instead of 360 allowed the lateral lines of his sphere to equal to six degrees. By this account, the polar circle on Gerbert's sphere was located at 54 degrees,  several degrees off from the actual 66° 33'. His positioning of the Tropic of Cancer at 24 degree was nearly exact, while his positioning of the equator was correct by definition. Richer also revealed how Gerbert made the planets more easily observable in his armillary sphere:

He succeeded equally in showing the paths of the planets when they come near or withdraw from the earth. He fashioned first an armillary sphere. He joined the two circles called by the Greeks coluri and by the Latins incidentes because they fell upon each other, and at their extremities he placed the poles. He drew with great art and accuracy, across the colures, five other circles called parallels, which, from one pole to the other, divided the half of the sphere into thirty parts. He put six of these thirty parts of the half-sphere between the pole and the first circle; five between the first and the second; from the second to the third, four; from the third to the fourth, four again; five from the fourth to the fifth; and from the fifth to the pole, six. On these five circles he placed obliquely the circles that the Greeks call loxos or zoe, the Latins obliques or vitalis (the zodiac) because it contained the figures of the animals ascribed to the planets. On the inside of this oblique circle he figured with an extraordinary art the orbits traversed by the planets, whose paths and heights he demonstrated perfectly to his pupils, as well as their respective distances.

Richer wrote about another of Gerbert's last armillary spheres, which had sighting tubes fixed on the axis of the hollow sphere that could observe the constellations, the forms of which he hung on iron and copper wires. This armillary sphere was also described by Gerbert in a letter to his colleague Constantine. Gerbert instructed Constantine that, if doubtful of the position of the pole star, he should fix the sighting tube of the armillary sphere into position to view the star he suspected was it, and if the star did not move out of sight, it was thus the pole star. Furthermore, Gerbert instructed Constantine that the north pole could be measured with the upper and lower sighting tubes, the Arctic Circle through another tube, the Tropic of Cancer through another tube, the equator through another tube, and the Tropic of Capricorn through another tube.

Ecclesiastical career
In 969, Borrell II made a pilgrimage to Rome, taking Gerbert with him. There Gerbert met Pope John XIII and Emperor Otto I. The pope persuaded Otto I to employ Gerbert as a tutor for his young son, Otto II. Some years later, Otto I gave Gerbert leave to study at the cathedral school of Rheims where he was soon appointed a teacher by Archbishop Adalberon. When Otto II became sole emperor in 973, he appointed Gerbert the abbot of the monastery of Bobbio and also appointed him as count of the district, but the abbey had been ruined by previous abbots, and Gerbert soon returned to Rheims. After the death of Otto II in 983, Gerbert became involved in the politics of his time. In 985, with the support of his archbishop, he opposed King Lothair of France's attempt to take Lorraine from Emperor Otto III by supporting Hugh Capet. Hugh became king of France, ending the Carolingian line of kings in 987.

Adalberon died on 23 January 989. Gerbert was a natural candidate for his succession, but King Hugh appointed Arnulf, an illegitimate son of King Lothair, instead. Arnulf was deposed in 991 for alleged treason against Hugh, and Gerbert was elected his successor. There was so much opposition to Gerbert's elevation to the See of Rheims, however, that Pope John XV (985–996) sent a legate to France who temporarily suspended Gerbert from his episcopal office. Gerbert sought to show that this decree was unlawful, but a further synod in 995 declared Arnulf's deposition invalid. Gerbert then became the teacher of Otto III, and Pope Gregory V (996–999), Otto III's cousin, appointed him archbishop of Ravenna in 998.

With imperial support, Gerbert was elected to succeed Gregory V as pope in 999. Gerbert took the name of Sylvester II, alluding to Sylvester I (314–335), the advisor to Emperor Constantine I (324–337). Soon after he became pope, Sylvester II confirmed the position of his former rival Arnulf as archbishop of Rheims. As pope, he took energetic measures against the widespread practices of simony and concubinage among the clergy, maintaining that only capable men of spotless lives should be allowed to become bishops. In 1001, the Roman populace revolted, forcing Otto III and Sylvester II to flee to Ravenna. Otto III led two unsuccessful expeditions to regain control of the city and died on a third expedition in 1002. Sylvester II returned to Rome soon after the emperor's death, although the rebellious nobility remained in power, and died a little later. Sylvester is buried in St. John Lateran.

Legacy

Gerbert of Aurillac was a humanist long before the Renaissance. He read Virgil, Cicero and Boethius; he studied Latin translations of Porphyry and Aristotle. He had a very accurate classification of the different disciplines of philosophy. He was the first French pope.

Gerbert was said to be one of the most noted scientists of his time. Gerbert wrote a series of works dealing with matters of the quadrivium (arithmetic, geometry, astronomy, music), which he taught using the basis of the trivium (grammar, logic, and rhetoric). In Rheims, he constructed a hydraulic-powered organ with brass pipes that excelled all previously known instruments, where the air had to be pumped manually. In a letter of 984, Gerbert asks Lupitus of Barcelona for a book on astrology and astronomy, two terms historian S. Jim Tester says Gerbert used synonymously. Gerbert may have been the author of a description of the astrolabe that was edited by Hermannus Contractus some 50 years later. Besides these, as Sylvester II he wrote a dogmatic treatise, De corpore et sanguine Domini—On the Body and Blood of the Lord.

Legends

The legend of Gerbert grows from the work of the English monk William of Malmesbury in De Rebus Gestis Regum Anglorum and a polemical pamphlet, Gesta Romanae Ecclesiae contra Hildebrandum, by Cardinal Beno, a partisan of Emperor Henry IV who opposed Pope Gregory VII in the Investiture Controversy. According to the legend, Gerbert, while studying mathematics and astrology in the Muslim cities of Córdoba and Seville, was accused of having learned sorcery. Gerbert was supposed to be in possession of a book of spells stolen from an Arab philosopher in Spain.  Gerbert fled, pursued by the victim, who could trace the thief by the stars, but Gerbert was aware of the pursuit, and hid hanging from a wooden bridge, where, suspended between heaven and earth, he was invisible to the magician.

Gerbert was supposed to have built a brazen head. This "robotic" head would answer his questions with "yes" or "no".  He was also reputed to have had a pact with a female demon called Meridiana, who had appeared after he had been rejected by his earthly love, and with whose help he managed to ascend to the papal throne (another legend tells that he won the papacy playing dice with the Devil).

According to the legend, Meridiana (or the bronze head) told Gerbert that if he should ever read a Mass in Jerusalem, the Devil would come for him. Gerbert then cancelled a pilgrimage to Jerusalem, but when he read Mass in the church Santa Croce in Gerusalemme ("Holy Cross of Jerusalem") in Rome, he became sick soon afterwards and, dying, he asked his cardinals to cut up his body and scatter it across the city.  In another version, he was even attacked by the Devil while he was reading the Mass, and the Devil mutilated him and gave his gouged-out eyes to demons to play with in the Church. Repenting, Sylvester II then cut off his hand and his tongue.

The inscription on Gerbert's tomb reads in part  ("This place will yield to the sound [of the last trumpet] the limbs of buried Sylvester II, at the advent of the Lord", mis-read as "will make a sound") and has given rise to the curious legend that his bones will rattle in that tomb just before the death of a pope.

The story of the crown and papal legate authority allegedly given to Stephen I of Hungary by Sylvester in the year 1000 (hence the title 'apostolic king') is noted by the 19th-century historian Lewis L. Kropf as a possible forgery of the 17th century. Likewise, the 20th-century historian Zoltan J. Kosztolnyik states that "it seems more than unlikely that Rome would have acted in fulfilling Stephen's request for a crown without the support and approval of the emperor."

Honours
Hungary issued a commemorative stamp honouring Pope Sylvester II on 1 January 1938, and France honoured him in 1964 by issuing a postage stamp.

Works

Gerbert's writings were printed in volume 139 of the Patrologia Latina. Darlington notes that Gerbert's preservation of his letters might have been an effort of his to compile them into a textbook for his pupils that would illustrate proper letter writing. His books on mathematics and astronomy were not research-oriented; his texts were primarily educational guides for his students.

Mathematical writings
Libellus de numerorum divisione
De geometria
Regula de abaco computi
Liber abaci
Libellus de rationali et ratione uti
Ecclesiastical writings
Sermo de informatione episcoporum
De corpore et sanguine Domini
Selecta e concil. Basol., Remens., Masom., etc.
Letters
Epistolae ante summum pontificatum scriptae (218 letters, including letters to the emperor, the pope, and various bishops)
Epistolae et decreta pontificia (15 letters to various abbots and bishops, including Arnulf)
a dubious letter to Otto III
five short poems
Other writings
Acta concilii Remensis ad S. Basolum
Leonis legati epistola ad Hugonem et Robertum reges
Celebacy for the guarantee of our future

In popular culture 
 Gerbert D'Aurillac appears as an adversary in Deborah Harkness' novel series called the All Souls Trilogy. He is portrayed by Trevor Eve in the trilogy's television adaptation.
 Gerbert d'Aurillac is the protagonist of Judith Tarr's 1989 novel Ars Magica.

See also
List of Roman Catholic scientist–clerics
Barcelona astrolabe

Notes

References

Citations

Bibliography

Further reading
 Brown, Nancy Marie. The Abacus and the Cross: The Story of the Pope Who Brought the Light of Science to the Dark Ages (Basic Books; 2010) 310 pages, 

 A translation of the letters of Gerbert (982–987) with introduction and notes, Harriet Pratt Lattin, tr., Columbus, OH, H. L. Hedrick, 1932.
 Letters of Gerbert, with His Papal Privileges as Sylvester II, Translated with an introduction by Harriet Pratt Lattin, Columbia University Press (1961),  
 The Peasant Boy who Became Pope: Story of Gerbert, Harriet Pratt Lattin, Henry Schuman, 1951.
 The Policy of Gerbert in the Election of Hugh Capet, 987: Based on a Study of His Letters, Harriet Pratt Lattin, Ohio State University, 1926.

External links

Catholic Encyclopedia
 Betty Mayfield, "Gerbert d'Aurillac and the March of Spain: A Convergence of Cultures"
Gerbert of Aurillac (ca. 955–1003), lecture by Lynn H. Nelson.
 Women's Biography: Adelaide of Burgundy, Ottonian empress, includes four of his letters to Adelaide of Italy.

940s births
1003 deaths
10th-century mathematicians
10th-century archbishops
10th-century astronomers
10th-century apocalypticists
10th-century French writers
10th-century Latin writers
10th-century poets
10th-century popes
11th-century archbishops
11th-century French people
11th-century popes
Archbishops of Reims
Benedictine popes
Catholic clergy scientists
French popes
Medieval French astronomers
Medieval French mathematicians
People from Cantal
Popes
10th-century French philosophers
Burials at the Archbasilica of Saint John Lateran